The Journal of South American Earth Sciences is a peer-reviewed scientific journal published by Elsevier. It covers the earth sciences, primarily on issues that are relevant to South America, Central America, the Caribbean, Mexico, and Antarctica. The journal was established in 1988 and the editor-in-chief is James Kellogg (University of South Carolina). According to the Journal Citation Reports, the journal has a 2012 impact factor of 1.533.

See also
Ameghiniana
Andean Geology
Brazilian Journal of Geology
Latin American Journal of Sedimentology and Basin Analysis
Revista de la Asociación Geológica Argentina

References

External links 
 

Geology journals
Geology of South America
Geology of Antarctica
Elsevier academic journals
English-language journals
Publications established in 1988
9 times per year journals